Alexandru Lungu may refer to:

 Alexandru Lungu (poet), Romanian poet
 Alexandru Lungu (fighter), Romanian judoka, mixed martial artist and kickboxer